Adolfo Méndez Vides (born 1956) is a Guatemalan writer who won the Nicaraguan Latin American Novel Prize in 1986 for his novel Los Catacumbas

References

1956 births
Living people
Guatemalan male writers
Date of birth missing (living people)
Place of birth missing (living people)